Fabrizio Poletti (born 13 July 1943) is a former Italian football manager and former player who played as a full-back.

He is remembered for his career with Torino, where he played for nine seasons, and won the Coppa Italia twice. He also represented the Italy national team, and was a member of the squad that reached the final of the 1970 FIFA World Cup.

Club career

Born in Bondeno, in the province of Ferrara, Emilia-Romagna, Poletti is mainly remembered for his lengthy spell with Serie A club Torino (1962–71), after joining the club in 1962, at the age of 18, winning two Coppa Italia titles during his time with the club (during the 1967–68 and 1970–71 seasons). After being acquired by the senior team during the 1960–61 season, but not making any appearances, at the beginning of his club career, Poletti initially played on loan for AC Asti (1961–62) in Serie D, making his professional debut with the club, and scoring 2 goals in 24 appearances, before returning to Torino the following season. He made his debut with the club on 21 October 1962, in a 1–0 away defeat to Genoa in Serie A. During his nine seasons in Turin, he made 275 official appearances for the club (224 in Serie A, with 18 goals, 37 in the Coppa Italia, with 4 goals, and 14 appearances in European Competitions, with 1 goal, as well as 10 in friendly matches, bringing his total to 285 appearances), scoring 23 goals, and is the club's 14th highest appearance holder. Alongside his team-mate Natalino Fossati, he formed one of the strongest full-back pairings in Serie A at the time, developing into an efficient two-way full-back, who contributed both offensively and defensively, under the tutelage of manager Nereo Rocco. During his time at the club, he was also the main penalty taker, despite being a defender, which allowed him to contribute with several goals throughout his career.

Poletti later moved to Cagliari (1971–74), and subsequently for a season at Sampdoria, where he ended his career at the end of the 1974–75 season, making 5 appearances (and one additional appearance in a friendly). In total, he spent 13 seasons in Serie A, making 294 appearances and scoring 20 goals, also making 344 career appearances, scoring 24 goals.

International career
Poletti earned 6 caps for the Italy national football team between 1965 and 1970, making his debut on 16 June 1965 against Sweden. Poletti also made 6 appearances for the Italian B -side, and was a member of the Italian team that won the gold medal at the 1963 Mediterranean Games in Naples. He also notably played for Italy in the 1970 FIFA World Cup Semi-final victory against West Germany, known as "the Match of the Century", coming on for the injured Roberto Rosato in extra-time; despite their performance, he and the Italian goalkeeper Albertosi are often held responsible for Gerd Müller's goal, due to a defensive misunderstanding between the two players. Italy went on to reach the final of the tournament, only to be defeated 4–1 by Brazil.

Managerial career
In January 1978, Poletti replaced Gianfranco Bozzao as Suzzara's coach in Serie D, but was unable to prevent the team's relegation to the Promozione league division. He is currently working and as a coach in Costa Rica, where he has resided after moving there in the 80s with his partner Maritza.

Personal life
Poletti has two children (Marco and Erika), three grandchildren (Milena, Fabiola, and Martina), and two great grandchildren (Samuele and Zoe). The evening of 15 October 1967, in Torino, he was hit by a car after crossing Corso Re Umberto, sustaining a minor injury to his leg; his close friend and team-mate Gigi Meroni, who was with him at the time following Torino's match against Sampdoria, was killed in the accident.

Honours

Club
Torino
Coppa Italia: 1967–68, 1970–71

International
Italy
Mediterranean Games: 1963
FIFA World Cup (Runner-up): 1970

Individual
Medaglia d'oro al valore atletico

References

1943 births
Living people
Italian footballers
Italy international footballers
1970 FIFA World Cup players
Torino F.C. players
Deportivo Saprissa managers
Expatriate football managers in Costa Rica
Association football defenders
Asti Calcio F.C. players
Mediterranean Games gold medalists for Italy
Mediterranean Games medalists in football
Competitors at the 1963 Mediterranean Games
Italian football managers